Mid-State Sisters of Skate (MSSOS) is a women's flat track roller derby league based in Stevens Point, Wisconsin. Founded in 2010, the league consists of two travel teams which play teams from other leagues. Mid-State is a member of the Women's Flat Track Derby Association (WFTDA).

History
Mid-State was founded in June 2010, with practices starting following try-outs in August.  It played its first public bout in June 2011, and by 2013 was attracting up to 200 fans to each bout.  However, it suffered a setback in April 2013 when its winter practice venue closed.

The league was accepted as a member of the Women's Flat Track Derby Association Apprentice Programme in July 2012, and became a full member of the WFTDA in June 2013.

Starting in 2015, Mid-State hosts an annual tournament called Uff Da Palooza, attracting teams from Canada and the United States. Uff Da Palooza is an official WFTDA Recognized Tournament.

WFTDA rankings

References

Stevens Point, Wisconsin
Roller derby leagues established in 2010
Roller derby leagues in Wisconsin
Women's Flat Track Derby Association Division 3
2010 establishments in Wisconsin